Tahuneh Ostad (also Romanized as Ţāhūneh Ostād; also known as Asīyāb Ostād (Persian: اسياب استاد), Tahoomeh Ostad, Ţāhū’īyeh Ostād, and Ţākhūneh Ostād) is a village in Kuh Panj Rural District, in the Central District of Bardsir County, Kerman Province, Iran. At the 2006 census, its population was 78, in 16 families.

References 

Populated places in Bardsir County